Djénhael Maingé (born 18 February 1992 in Martinique) is a professional footballer who plays as a forward for Club Franciscain in the Martinique Championnat National  and internationally for Martinique.

He made his debut for Martinique in 2012. He was in the Martinique Gold Cup squad for the 2017  tournament.

In January 2015, Maingé spent 2 weeks on trial with SCO Angers. This was not successful, but he remained in France to play for Club Franciscain in the Coupe de France match against Nantes. In May 2018, Maingé scored for Club Franciscain as the Martinique side beat Central FC 2-1 to qualify for the 2018 CONCACAF League.

References

1992 births
Living people
Martiniquais footballers
French footballers
 Martinique international footballers
Association football forwards
Club Franciscain players